The Federation Cup 1994–95 was the first edition of the IIHF Federation Cup. The season started on November 11, 1994, and finished on December 29, 1994.

The tournament was won by Salavat Yulaev Ufa, who beat HC Pardubice in the final.

First stage

Group A
(Oświęcim, Poland)

Group A Semifinals

Group A Third Place

Group A Final

Group B
(Poprad, Slovakia)

Group B Semifinals

Group B Third Place

Group B Final

Group C
(Belgrade, FR Yugoslavia)

Group C Semifinals

Group C Third Place

Group C Final

 HDD Olimpija Ljubljana    :  bye

Final stage
(Ljubljana, Slovenia)

Semifinals

Third place match

Final

References
 Federation Cup 1995

Fed
IIHF Federation Cup